The 2017–18 UTEP Miners basketball team represented the University of Texas at El Paso during the 2017–18 NCAA Division I men's basketball season. The Miners, led by interim head coach Phil Johnson, played their home games at the Don Haskins Center as members of Conference USA. They finished the season 11–20, 6–12 in C-USA play to finish in a tie for 11th place. They lost in the first round of the C-USA tournament to UTSA. UTEP averaged 6,155 fans per game.

Following a loss to Lamar on November 27, 2017 that saw the Miners drop to 1–5 on the season, head coach Tim Floyd announced that he was retiring effective immediately. The school had previously announced a new athletic director, Jim Senter, a week prior, but Floyd said that had nothing to do with his decision. Assistant Phil Johnson was named interim head coach of the Miners the next day. On March 12, 2018, the school hired Fresno State head coach Rodney Terry as the new head coach of the Miners.

Previous season
The Miners finished the 2016–17 season 15–17, 12–6 in C-USA play to finish in a tie for third place. In the C-USA tournament, they defeated Rice in the quarterfinals before losing to top-seeded Middle Tennessee in the semifinals.

Offseason

Departures

Incoming Transfers

Class of 2017 recruits

Class of 2018 recruits

Roster

Schedule and results

|-
!colspan=9 style=|Exhibition

|-
!colspan=9 style=|Non-conference regular season

|-
!colspan=12 style=| Conference USA regular season

|-
!colspan=9 style=| Conference USA tournament

Source

See also
2017–18 UTEP Miners women's basketball team

References

UTEP Miners men's basketball seasons
UTEP